Vassily Serafimovich Sinaisky (Russian: Васи́лий Серафи́мович Сина́йский, born in Abez, Komi Republic, April 20, 1947) is a Russian conductor and pianist.

Biography
Sinaisky studied conducting with Ilya Musin at the Leningrad Conservatory and began his career as assistant to Kirill Kondrashin at the Moscow Philharmonic Orchestra.

Sinaisky was Chief Conductor of the Latvian National Symphony Orchestra from 1976 to 1989.  He served as Music Director and Principal Conductor of the Moscow Philharmonic Orchestra from 1991 to 1996. He has also held the post of Principal Guest Conductor of the Netherlands Philharmonic Orchestra.

Sinaisky was Principal Guest Conductor of the BBC Philharmonic from 1996 until January 2012.  Sinaisky has made several recordings with the BBC Philharmonic for Chandos, including works by Karol Szymanowski, Rodion Shchedrin, Mily Balakirev, Nikolai Rimsky-Korsakov, and Franz Schreker, as well as a series of recordings of Dmitri Shostakovich's film music.  Sinaisky now has the title of conductor emeritus with the BBC Philharmonic.

Sinaisky was principal conductor of the Malmö Symphony Orchestra from January 2007 through the 2010-2011 season.  With the Malmö orchestra, he has conducted commercial recordings for the Naxos label, including music of Franz Schmidt.  He became Conductor in Residence at the Bolshoi Theatre with the 2009-2010 season.  In August 2010, he was named the Bolshoi's music director and chief conductor.  In December 2013, Sinaisky resigned his posts with the Bolshoi Theatre, with immediate effect.

In December 2018, Sinaisky first guest-conducted the Janáček Philharmonic Orchestra.  He returned for a second guest-conducting engagement at the start of the 2019-2020 season.  In April 2020, the orchestra announced the appointment of Sinaisky as its next chief conductor, effective with the 2020-2021 season.

Recordings
Shostakovich: Film Music Vol. 1.  Chandos 10023
Shostakovich: Film Music Vol. 2.  Chandos 10183
Schreker: Orchestral Works Vol. 1.  Chandos 9797
Schreker: Orchestral Works Vol. 2.  Chandos 9951
Balakirev: Symphony 1, Overture King Lear, In Bohemia.  Chandos 24129
Liadov: Baba Yaga, Enchanted Lake, Kikimora. Chandos 9911
Dvořák: Slavonic Dance, The Water Goblin, Symphony No. 7. BBC Music MM60
Tchaikovsky - Piano Concerto No. 1 in B-flat minor, Op. 23 / Grieg - Piano Concerto in A minor, Op. 16. Denis Kozhukhin, Vassily Sinaisky,  Rundfunk-Sinfonieorchester Berlin.  Pentatone PTC 5186566

References

External links
 Intermusica biography of Vassily Sinaisky
 IMG Artists biography of Sinaisky

1947 births
Living people
People from Inta
21st-century Russian conductors (music)
Russian male conductors (music)
21st-century Russian male musicians